The 2011 BYU Cougars football team represented Brigham Young University in the 2011 NCAA Division I FBS football season. The Cougars, led by head coach Bronco Mendenhall, played their home games at LaVell Edwards Stadium. This was the first year they competed as an independent in football. They finished the season 10–3 and were invited to the Armed Forces Bowl where they defeated Tulsa 24–21.

2011 media
The school announced that the annual BYU Football Media days would be July 12, 2011 and would be broadcast live on BYUtv. Special question and answer segments with current players and BYU Hall of Famers would take place throughout the day on BYUtv.org. Having no other sports to broadcast that day, ESPN announced they would simulcast two of the events live on ESPN3. All games will be broadcast on KSL 102.7 FM and 1160 AM, on the internet at KSL.com, and through the various BYU Cougars sport network affiliates. Additionally BYUtv will broadcast a one-hour pregame show live (called Countdown to Kickoff and hosted by Dave McCann, Alema Harrington, and David Nixon) followed by a Post-game Show with Interviews from players and coaches about the games outcome. The Bronco Mendenhall Monday Press Conference will be shown live every Monday on www.byutv.org (live events link) instead of the actual BYUtv Channel. BYUtv Sports will also be able to provide their own announcers for the BYUtv Gameday Replay of all home games with Dave McCann doing play-by-play, Gary Sheide or Blaine Fowler doing color commentary, and Robbie Bullough or Jarom Jordan doing sideline reporting.

BYU Radio Sports Network Affiliates

KSL 102.7 FM and 1160 AM- Flagship Station (Salt Lake City/ Provo, UT and ksl.com)
BYU Radio- Nationwide (Dish Network 980, Sirius XM 143, and byuradio.org)
KIDO- Boise, ID [football only]
KTHK- Blackfoot/ Idaho Falls/ Pocatello/ Rexburg, ID
KMGR- Manti, UT
KSUB- Cedar City, UT
KDXU- St. George, UT
KSHP- Las Vegas, NV [football only]
KNZZ- Grand Junction, CO [football only]

Schedule

Roster

Rankings

Regular season

Mississippi

BYU's first game as a football independent.
Sources:

Texas

Sources:

Utah

Sources:

Central Florida

Sources:

Utah State

Sources:

San Jose State

Sources:

Oregon State

Sources:

Idaho State

Sources:

TCU

Sources:

Idaho

Sources:

New Mexico State

Sources:

Hawaii

Sources:

Armed Forces Bowl- Tulsa

Sources: 

Cody Hoffman (BYU) was voted the offensive MVP of the game because of his 3 Touchdown Receptions and Dexter McCoil (Tulsa) was voted the defensive MVP of the game because of his 2 Interceptions. Kyle Van Noy was 2nd in the defensive MVP voting.

Season news
During Spring Training QB Jake Heaps was named one of the top 3 non-AQ players to watch in 2011 by ESPN's Andrea Adelson.

Rivals.com named OT Matt Reynolds as No. 24 on their top 100 countdown in 2011. Reynolds would later be named on ESPN's Pre-Season All-American team.

At the Utah State game, Brandon Doman proposed benching Heaps and seeing what Riley Nelson could do. Nelson rallied the Cougars to beat the Aggies and would become the starting QB for every game he was healthy in the rest of the season. Nelson would go on to win 4 FBS Independent Player of the Week awards.

BYU decided to add running back Michael Alisa to their running back rotation at homecoming. Alisa would become the starting RB for the rest of the season after going for 91 yards on 16 carries.

Matt Putnam was ruled eligible for the Cougars starting in October and became one of the many linebacker beasts.

On November 7, Bronco Mendenhall announced that senior Jordan Pendleton would have season ending knee surgery. As a tribute for his teammates play and attitude, Kyle Van Noy would wear his number at senior night. Pendleton won two FBS Independent defensive player of the week awards during his senior season.

On December 5, Jake Heaps announced he would transfer after the semester ended. James Lark would resume the backup QB role for the bowl game and for the 2012 season. It was later announced he would transfer to Kansas.

References

BYU
BYU Cougars football seasons
Armed Forces Bowl champion seasons
BYU Cougars football